Anabel María Fernanda Yapura Plaza (born 6 May 1998) is an Argentine road cyclist, who currently rides for French amateur team CM Aubervilliers 93–Saint-Michel. She has competed since 2016, ranking sixth in the Argentinian National Championships for the individual time trial and sixteenth in the road race.

Career
In 2015, Yapura collected a bronze medal in the Mirador del Sol Challenge as an amateur, while the following year she competed in the Gran Prix San Luis Femenino, a UCI 1.2 ranked event, for Escuela Ciclismo Fundación Nova, though she did not finish the race. Later that year she took part in the Tour Femenino de San Luis, a 2.1 ranked event, in which she placed 55th in the general classification, but 11th in the youth classification. In April 2016, she competed in the Argentine national road cycling championships, finishing sixth in the individual time trial and sixteenth in the road race. She joined the  team for 2017, racing as part of their team for both the SwissEver GP Cham – Hagendorn, where she placed 41st, and the Vuelta a Colombia Femenina Oro y Paz, a UCI 2.2 ranked event, in which she finished 13th in the mountains classification.

References

External links

1998 births
Living people
Argentine female cyclists
Cyclists at the 2019 Pan American Games
Pan American Games competitors for Argentina
21st-century Argentine women